The A Year Without Rain Tour was the second concert tour by American band Selena Gomez & the Scene. Marked as the band's headlining tour, it supported their second studio album, A Year Without Rain.

Background

Previously, the band tour the United States and Europe playing at state fairs and music festivals with a few headlining concerts thrown in. The tour became a major success with critics and spectators alike, selling out many dates within the United States. After the release of their second studio album, the band toured alongside Katy Perry, Bruno Mars and Enrique Iglesias for the KIIS-FM Jingle Ball concert series. Gomez remarked her excitement for the tour and stated that it provided motivation to plan a "big" tour for 2011.

During a backstage interview, Gomez remarked that she was conceptualizing the tour as far as stage and production and promised an amazing show with an "epic" stage for 2011. The tour was officially announced on the band's official website in September 2010 to begin in London. The band played their first dates in South America before heading to the United States to perform in festivals.

Opening act
Allstar Weekend
Days Difference (Dixon)
Christina Grimmie

Set list

"Round & Round"
"Crush"
"Kiss & Tell"
"More"
"You Belong with Me"
"I Won't Apologize"
"The Way I Loved You"
"A Year Without Rain"
"I Don't Miss You At All"
"Off the Chain"
"Hot n Cold"
"Falling Down"
"Love Is a Battlefield"
"In My Head"
"Tell Me Something I Don't Know"
Encore
"Naturally"
"Magic"

Tour dates

Festivals and other miscellaneous performances
This concert was a part of the Justin Timberlake Shriners Hospitals for Children Open
This concert was a part of the Arizona State Fair
These concerts were a part of the Jingle Ball
This concert is a part of Borderfest
This concert is a part of Houston Livestock Show and Rodeo
This concert is a part of Concert for Hope
This concert is a part of the Dixon May Fair
This concert is a part of Wango Tango

Box office score data

References

External links
 Selena Gomez & the Scene's Official Website

2010 concert tours
2011 concert tours
Selena Gomez & the Scene concert tours